Ali Beygluy-e Olya (also Romanized as ‘Alī Beyglūy-e ‘Olyā; also known as ‘Alī Beyglū-ye ‘Olyā and ‘Alībeyglū-ye ‘Olyā) is a village in Charuymaq-e Jonubegharbi Rural District, in the Central District of Charuymaq County, East Azerbaijan Province, Iran. At the 2006 census, its population was 116, in 21 families.

References 

Populated places in Charuymaq County